DG Canum Venaticorum is a variable binary star system in the northern constellation of Canes Venatici. As of 2009, the pair have an angular separation of 0.20″ along a position angle of 285°, which corresponds to a physical separation of around 3.6 AU. With an apparent visual magnitude of 12.02, the pair are much too faint to be seen with the naked eye. Parallax measurements place the system at a distance of roughly 59 light years from the Earth.

The stellar classification of the primary component is M4.0Ve, indicating it is a red dwarf with emission lines present. It is considered a very young system with an estimated age of just 30 million years and a higher metallicity than the Sun. One of the components is rotating rapidly, with a projected rotational velocity of 50 km/s. At least one of the members of this system is a type of variable known as a flare star, which means it undergoes brief increases in brightness at random intervals. On April 23, 2014, a gamma-ray superflare event was observed by the Swift satellite coming from the position of this system. It may have been perhaps the most luminous such events ever observed coming from a red dwarf star. A secondary radio flare was observed a day later.

References

External links
 

Canes Venatici
M-type main-sequence stars
Flare stars
Canum Venaticorum, DG
3789
Binary stars
Emission-line stars